The Corleck Head (Irish: Sliabh na Trí nDée, or Sliabh na nDée Dána) is a 1st or 2nd century AD carved stone found c. 1855 on Corleck Hill in the townland of Drumeague, County Cavan, Ireland. It is carved from a single block of local limestone, and shows a three-faced (tricephalic) stone god or idol with closely set eyes, broad and rounded noses, and simply drawn mouths. These features give the faces expressionless but enigmatic facial expressions. The head has a short neck or base carved from the same block of stone.

As with most stone artifacts from the European Iron Age period, its cultural origin, significance and function are unknown. It probably represents a Celtic god and was probably once part of a larger shrine associated with Lughnasadh, a three day harvest festival. Its design is influenced by contemporary Romano-British iconography of a trinity representing the unity of the past, present and future, such as the three female deities known as the Matres and Matronae who are often represented as ancestral mothers representing "strength, power and fertility", or an all-knowing god with "all-seeing eyes".

The head was discovered around 1855 during the excavation of a large Neolithic site but was not reported to archeologists until 1948 after its prehistoric dating was realised by the historian Thomas Barron; until then it had been placed on top of a gatepost. Today it is on permanent display at the archaeology branch of the National Museum of Ireland in Dublin. The head was included as #19 in the 2011 book A History of Ireland in 100 Objects.

Discovery
The date and exact circumstances of the head's discovery are unknown but estimated to have occurred as around 1855 or at latest 1900. It was found at a quarry on Drumeague Hill during the disassembly of a passage grave located within a stone circle and 64 meter circular embankment complex on the nearby Corleck Hill. The site is sometimes known as Sliabh na Trí nDée, or Sliabh na nDée Dána, which translates to "hill of the three gods". It was traditionally associated with the Lughnasadh, a  Gaelic harvest festival, suggesting that the head was one of a series of objects placed at the site during the festival. The head was probably hidden at the same time as the "Corraghy Head", a nearby found carved stone bust of a bearded man.

After its discovery, the head time was placed on top of a gatepost in the Hall family farm. A family friend recalled spending "days as children on a day visit" throwing stones at the head. It was first recognized as ancient in 1935 by the local historian Thomas Barron. He contacted the National Museum of Ireland in 1937, and it was brought to Dublin for study by the  Austrian archaeologist Adolf Mahr, then the museum's director.  Mahr later secured funding to acquire it into the museum's collection. Study of the object preoccupied Barron until his death in 1978 and became closely associated with him.

Description
The Corleck head is a relatively large example of the type, being 33 cm high and 22.5 cm at its widest point. Each face has very simple and only slightly individualised features. Each has, according to the archeologist Eamonn P. Kelly, "bossed eyes, a broad nose and slit mouth", but they are given equally enigmatic but slightly different facial expressions; one face is heavily browed and another has a small hole at the center of its mouth—a feature of several contemporary carved heads found in Yorkshire.

The small mortise hole under the statue's base suggests it was placed on a pedestal, probably as part of a shrine, cult center, or another type of larger display. While its function is unknown, it probably represents a Celtic god, in a format derived from contemporary Romano-British iconography and symbolism. The triple-head motif seems to indicate an "all-knowing", "all-seeing" god, that according to writer Miranda Aldhouse-Green, was "used to gain knowledge of places or events far away in time and space".

Dating isolated pieces of Iron Age sculpture of this kind is extremely difficult and is often based on their resemblance to other similar examples. While the majority of the stone heads found in the northern Irish counties since the 19th century are now believed to be prehistoric, a number have been identified as either Medieval, or 17th or 18th century folk art.

Idolatry

The head is one of the earliest known Iron Age anthropomorphic stone carvings found in Ireland, although it post-dates by around a millennium, the c. 3,000–2500 BC Tandragee Idol found in County Armagh. All of the faces in contemporary examples have closely set but staring eyes, simple grooved mouths and flat, wedge-shaped noses. The hole at its base indicates that it was once attached to a larger structure, perhaps a much longer pillar, comparable to the 6-foot wooden carving found in the 1790s in a bog near Aghadowey, County Londonderry, which is now lost but known from a 19th drawing which shows an idol with four faces.

Of the Irish Iron Age three-faced stone idols to survive, most are also cut from a single limestone blocks. Of these the Corleck Head is widely considered the finest in both its simplicity of design and complexity of expression. Other examples include a triple-head from in Cortynan, County Armagh found before 1935, an object found in Glejbjerg, Denmark, and two carved triple-heads from Greetland, England.

References

Citations

Sources

 Aldhouse-Green, Miranda. The Celtic Myths: A Guide to the Ancient Gods and Legends. London: Thames and Hudson, 2015. 
 Armit, Ian. "Headhunting and the Body in Iron Age Europe". Cambridge: Cambridge University Press, 2012. 
 Duffy, Patrick. "Reviewed Work: Landholding, Society and Settlement In Ireland: a historical geographer's perspective by T. Jones Hughes". Clogher Record, volume 21, No. 1 (2012). 
 Gleeson, Patrick. "Reframing the first millennium AD in Ireland: archaeology, history, landscape". Proceedings of the Royal Irish Academ, 2022 
 Kelly, Eamonn.  "The Iron Age". In Ó Floinn, Raghnall; Wallace, Patrick (eds). Treasures of the National Museum of Ireland: Irish Antiquities. Dublin: National Museum of Ireland, 2002. 
 Kelly, Eamonn. "Treasures of Ireland: Catalogue entries, Late Bronze Age and Iron Age Antiquities". Treasures of Ireland: Irish Art 3000 BC – 1500 AD. Dublin: Royal Irish Academy, 1983
 Morahan, Leo. "A Stone Head from Killeen, Belcarra, Co. Mayo". Journal of the Galway Archaeological and Historical Society, volume 41, 1987–1988. 
 Ó Floinn, Raghnall; Wallace, Patrick (eds). Treasures of the National Museum of Ireland: Irish Antiquities. National Museum of Ireland, 2002. 
 Ó Hogain, Dáithí. "Patronage & Devotion in Ancient Irish Religion". History Ireland, volume 8, no. 4, winter 2000. 
 Paterson, T.G.F. "Carved Head from Cortynan, Co. Armagh". The Journal of the Royal Society of Antiquaries of Ireland, volume 92, No. 1, 1962. 
 Raftery, Barry. Pagan Celtic Ireland: The Enigma of the Irish Iron Age. London: Thames & Hudson, 1994
 Ross, Anne. "The Human Head in Insular Pagan Celtic Religion". Proceedings of the Society of Antiquaries of Scotland. Volume 91, 1958
 Rynne, Etienn. "Celtic Stone Idols in Ireland". In: Thomas, Charles. The Iron Age in the Irish Sea province. London: Council for British Archaeology, 1972
 Rynne, Etienn.  "The Three Stone Heads at Woodlands, near Raphoe, Co. Donegal". The Journal of the Royal Society of Antiquaries of Ireland, volume 94, no. 2, 1964. 
 Smyth, Jonathan. "Gentleman and Scholar: Thomas James Barron, 1903 - 1992". Cumann Seanchais Bhreifne (Breifne Historical Society), 2012. 
 Waddell, John. The Prehistoric Archaeology of Ireland. Galway: Galway University Press, 1998.  
 Warner, Richard. "Two pagan idols - remarkable new discoveries". Archaeology Ireland, volume 17, no. 1, 2003

External links

Celtic stone heads
Collection of the National Museum of Ireland
Irish art
Prehistoric Ireland
Stone objects